The Albert Einstein Medal is an award presented by the Albert Einstein Society in Bern. First given in 1979, the award is presented to people for "scientific findings, works, or publications related to Albert Einstein" each year.

Recipients 
Source: Einstein Society

 2020: Event Horizon Telescope (EHT) scientific collaboration
 2019: Clifford Martin Will
 2018: Juan Martín Maldacena
 2017: LIGO Scientific Collaboration and the Virgo Collaboration
 2016: Alexei Yuryevich Smirnov
 2015: Stanley Deser and Charles Misner
 2014: Tom W. B. Kibble
 2013: Roy Kerr
 2012: Alain Aspect
 2011: Adam Riess, Saul Perlmutter
 2010: Hermann Nicolai
 2009: Kip Stephen Thorne
 2008: Beno Eckmann
 2007: Reinhard Genzel
 2006: Gabriele Veneziano
 2005: Murray Gell-Mann
 2004: Michel Mayor
 2003: George F. Smoot
 2001: Johannes Geiss, Hubert Reeves
 2000: Gustav Tammann
 1999: Friedrich Hirzebruch
 1998: Claude Nicollier
 1996: Thibault Damour
 1995: Chen Ning Yang
 1994: Irwin Shapiro
 1993: Max Flückiger, Adolf Meichle
 1992: Peter Bergmann
 1991: Joseph Hooton Taylor, Jr.
 1990: Roger Penrose
 1989: Markus Fierz
 1988: John Archibald Wheeler
 1987: Jeanne Hersch
 1986: Rudolf Mössbauer
 1985: Edward Witten
 1984: Victor Weisskopf
 1983: Hermann Bondi
 1982: Friedrich Traugott Wahlen

 1979: Stephen Hawking

See also
 Albert Einstein Award, Lewis and Rosa Strauss Memorial Fund
 Albert Einstein World Award of Science, World Cultural Council
 Einstein Prize, American Physical Society
 List of physics awards
 UNESCO Albert Einstein medal, United Nations Educational, Scientific and Cultural Organization

References

Awards established in 1979
Albert Einstein
Physics awards
Science and technology awards